Andrin Gulich (born 9 March 1999) is a Swiss rower. He competed in the 2020 Summer Olympics.

References

1999 births
Living people
Rowers at the 2020 Summer Olympics
Swiss male rowers
Olympic rowers of Switzerland